Southern Nicobarese is a Nicobarese language, spoken on the Southern Nicobar Islands of Little Nicobar (Ong), Great Nicobar (Lo'ong), and a couple small neighboring islands, Kondul (Lamongshe) and Pulo Milo (Milo Island). Each is said to have its own dialect.

Distribution
Parmanand Lal (1977:23) reported 11 Nicobarese villages with 192 people in all, located mostly along the western coast of Great Nicobar Island. Pulo-babi village was the site of Lal's extensive ethnographic study.

Pulo-kunyi
Kopenhaiyen
Kashindon
Koye
Pulo-babi
Batadiya
Kakaiyu
Pulo-pucca
Ehengloy
Pulo-baha
Chinge

Lal (1977:104) also reported the presence of several Shompen villages in the interior of Great Nicobar Island.
Dakade (10 km northeast of Pulo-babi, a Nicobarese village; 15 persons and 4 huts)
Puithey (16 km southeast of Pulo-babi)
Tataiya (inhabited by the Dogmar River Shompen group, who had moved from Tataiya to Pulo-kunyi between 1960 and 1977)

Vocabulary
Paul Sidwell (2017) published in ICAAL 2017 conference on Nicobarese languages.

See also
Shompen language, also spoken on Great Nicobar

References

Languages of India
Nicobarese languages